The 2009 IFSC Climbing World Cup was held in 14 locations. Bouldering competitions were held in 5 locations, lead in 6 locations, and speed in 4 locations. The season began on 11 April in Kazo, Japan and concluded on 15 November in Kranj, Slovenia.

The top 3 in each competition received medals, and the overall winners were awarded trophies. At the end of the season an overall ranking was determined based upon points, which athletes were awarded for finishing in the top 30 of each individual event.

The winners for bouldering were Kilian Fischhuber and Akiyo Noguchi, for lead Adam Ondra and Johanna Ernst, for speed Sergei Sinitcyn and Edyta Ropek, and for combined Adam Ondra and Akiyo Noguchi, men and women respectively.
The National Team for bouldering was France, for lead Austria, and for speed Russian Federation.

Highlights of the season 
In bouldering, at the World Cup in Hall, Austria, Akiyo Noguchi of Japan and Anna Stöhr of Austria flashed all boulders in the final round, and because they were tied on countbacks too, they did a super final round where they both also flashed the boulder problem, eventually making them both joint winners.

In lead climbing, at the World Cup in Puurs, Belgium, Johanna Ernst of Austria, Jain Kim of South Korea, and Maja Vidmar of Slovenia were tied in the final round and tied on countbacks too, so they did a super final round where Johanna Ernst took the win.

Adam Ondra of Czech Republic, at age sixteen, made his debut in the World Cup circuit in bouldering competition in Hall, Austria, placing third. He then competed in lead climbing, won 4 out of 6 Lead World Cups and the overall men's lead title of the season. He also won the men's combined title of the season.

Overview

References

External links 

IFSC Climbing World Cup
2009 in sport climbing